Manuela, released as Stowaway Girl in the United States, is a 1957 British drama film directed by Guy Hamilton. It was entered into the 7th Berlin International Film Festival.

Cast
 Trevor Howard as James Prothero
 Elsa Martinelli as Manuela Hunt
 Pedro Armendáriz as Mario Constanza
 Donald Pleasence as Evans
 Warren Mitchell as Moss
 Jack MacGowran as Tommy
 Leslie Weston as Bleloch
 Harcourt Curacao as Wellington Jones
 Barry Lowe as Murphy
 Juan Carolilla as Official
 John Rae as Ferguson
 Roger Delgado as Stranger
 Harold Kasket as Pereira
 Max Butterfield as Bliss
 Andy Ho as Cook
 Peter Illing as Agent
 Armand Guinle as Patron
 Michael Peake as Coca-Cola Man
 Ali Allen as Boy (uncredited)
 Christopher Lee as Voice of Wellington Jones (uncredited)

References

External links

1957 films
1957 drama films
British black-and-white films
British drama films
Films directed by Guy Hamilton
Films scored by William Alwyn
Paramount Pictures films
1950s English-language films
1950s British films